Peruvaripallam Dam is an earth-filled embankment dam on the Peruvaripallam River in Palakkad district of Kerala, India. The dam's reservoir is connected to the nearby Thunacadavu Reservoir to the south by an open cut channel. It is part of the Parambikulam Aliyar (Irrigation) Project. The Parambikulam Dam is located to the south.

References

Dams in Kerala
Earth-filled dams
Dams completed in 1971
Buildings and structures in Palakkad district
1971 establishments in Kerala
20th-century architecture in India